Union Sportive Roye-Noyon Cœur de Picardie is a French association football club founded in 2010 as a result of a merger between Union Sportive Royenne (founded in 1928) and Sporting Club Noyon (founded in 1927). It is based in Roye, Somme, France and plays in Régional 1 Hauts-de-France, the sixth tier in the French football league system.

History 
US Roye-Noyon was formed on 21 June 2010 as a result of a merger between Union Sportive Royenne and Sporting Club Noyon, who were both in financial difficulty. The former club of US Royenne club participated in the Championnat National during the 2004–05 season.

The two towns of Roye and Noyon are over 20 kilometers (12 miles) apart, and are not in the same department. Roye is in the Somme while Noyon is in the Oise department. US Roye-Noyon is based in Roye, but was initially affiliated to the Oise district of the Picardie league until the 2020–21 season. In the 2021–22 season, the club joined the Somme district of the Picardie league.

Season-by-Season
Note: statistics prior to the 2010–11 season belong to the defunct football club US Royenne.

References

External links
 

Football clubs in France
2010 establishments in France
Association football clubs established in 2010
Sport in Somme (department)
Football clubs in Hauts-de-France
Sport in Oise